Malá Roudka is a municipality and village in Blansko District in the South Moravian Region of the Czech Republic. It has about 200 inhabitants.

Administrative parts
The village of Skočova Lhota is an administrative part of Malá Roudka.

References

Villages in Blansko District